Tateyama Tameike Dam is an earthfill dam located in Yamagata Prefecture in Japan. The dam is used for irrigation. The catchment area of the dam is  km2. The dam impounds about 1  ha of land when full and can store 23 thousand cubic meters of water. The construction of the dam was completed in 1950.

References

Dams in Yamagata Prefecture
1950 establishments in Japan